The Magnificent Lie may refer to:

 The Magnificent Lie (1931 film), American film
 The Magnificent Lie (1955 film), Swedish film